Geurt van Beuningen (1565–1633) was a Dutch Golden Age merchant and burgomaster of Amsterdam who was one of the founders of the Dutch East India Company.

Biography
Around 1600, Van Beuningen moved from the Kalverstraat to the Sint Antoniesbreestraat, where he lived next-door to Pieter Lastman, who taught Rembrandt in those years.  

The son of a cheese-dealer, Van Beuningen was at first a merchant in dairy products, but became one of the biggest shareholder in the Dutch East India Company. He invested 15,000 guilders when the company was founded in 1602 and was named bewindhebber (governor) of the company. In 1623 Van Beuningen bought up all the pepper being shipped to Amsterdam, something which proved highly profitable was later repeated by others. 

From the hand of Vondel the following anecdote on Van Beuningen's is known: scarcely recovered from a heavy illness, Van Beuningen (who was a Remonstrant Calvinist) wanted to go to the city hall on Dam Square, where a crucial decision was about to be taken. He received advice from the physician Nicolaes Tulp and a second opinion from a Roman Catholic physician. The latter one told him to travel with Tulp, also a fierce Calvinist, in his carriage to the city hall. Mayor Reynier Pauw, an anti-Remonstrant and one of the judges of Johan van Oldenbarneveldt, had not reckoned with another opponent and was stunned to see him walking in.

Descendants
His son Dirk van Beuningen (1588–1648) married Catharina Burgh, sister of Albert Burgh. Dirk van Beuningen was active in the grain trade between Muscovy and the Levant, together with his brother-in-law Reynier Reaal. Dirk van Beuningen  and his wife had six children, including the diplomat and burgomaster Coenraad van Beuningen.

References

Bibliography 

 Israel, J. (1995) The Dutch Republic. Its Rise, Greatness and Fall, p. 345–346
 Elias, J. E. (1903–1905, herdruk 1963) De vroedschap van Amsterdam, 1578–1795, 2 vols.

16th-century Dutch businesspeople
17th-century Dutch businesspeople
17th-century Dutch politicians
1565 births
1633 deaths
Businesspeople from Amsterdam
Founders of the Dutch East India Company
Mayors of Amsterdam
Remonstrants